is a video game in the Langrisser series, and is the sequel to Langrisser IV. It has never been released outside Japan.

Development 
Development began in July 1997 and was completed in March 1998. The development diary goes until April 1, however, it is an April Fools joke.

Story 
Langrisser V takes place shortly after the end of Langrisser IV.

Music 
The music in Langrisser V was composed by Noriyuki Iwadare.

References 

1998 video games
Japan-exclusive video games
PlayStation (console) games
PlayStation Network games
Sega Saturn games
5, The End of Legend
Video games developed in Japan
Video games scored by Noriyuki Iwadare

Single-player video games
Career Soft games